Roman W. Prezioso, Jr. (born June 29, 1949) is an American politician and former West Virginia state senator representing the 13th district which comprises parts of Marion and Monongalia counties. He is a member of the Democratic Party.

Background 
Roman Prezioso was born on June 29, 1949. He had been an educator and administrator prior to his election to public office. He lives in Fairmont, West Virginia.

Prezioso went to Monongah High School with Alabama football coach Nick Saban.

Service 
Prior to his election to the West Virginia Senate, he was a delegate in the West Virginia House of Delegates from 1988 to 1996. He served in the Senate from 1996 to 2020.

Committee memberships 
Standing Committees
Banking and Insurance
Economic Development
Finance
Health and Human Resources Chair
Labor
Rules
Natural Resources

Interim committees
Legislative Intern Committee Chair
Select Committee A - Flooding and Railroad Issues Chair
Joint Committee on Technology Chair
Finance Subcommittee A
Joint Commission on Economic Development
Select Committee C - Pharmaceutical Availability and Affordability
Joint Standing Committee on Finance
Legislative Rule-Making Review Committee

See also 
 List of members of the 79th West Virginia Senate

References

External links 
 West Virginia Legislature

1949 births
20th-century American politicians
21st-century American politicians
American school administrators
Educators from West Virginia
Living people
Democratic Party members of the West Virginia House of Delegates
Politicians from Fairmont, West Virginia
Democratic Party West Virginia state senators